Felicia oleosa is an evergreen, richly branched dwarf shrub of up to  high, that is assigned to the family Asteraceae. It has narrow, awl-shaped leaves, with translucent oil or resin dots, pointing upwards, crowded on the younger stems. The flower heads have about thirteen bright blue ray florets, encircling many yellow disc florets. This species grows in the mountains dividing the Karoo region of South Africa. It is sometimes called oily blue daisy in English.

Description 
The older shoots have lost their leaves. The leaf axils are barely noticeably hairy.

The involucre is about 6 mm in diameter and consists of three to four rows of straw yellow, overlapping bracts with red-tinged tips. In the center of each corolla are five anthers merged into a tube, through which the style grows when the floret opens, hoovering up the pollen on its shaft. At the tip of both style branches is a triangular appendage.

Differences with other Felicia species 
In contrast to F. venusta, the leaves of F. oleosa overlap, point upwards, and contain translucent resin or oil ducts. The involucral bracts are narrowly lance-shaped and also contain ducts. The pappus consists of bristles with short teeth.

Taxonomy 
As far as known, this species was first collected for science by Robert Harold Compton in 1926, but has not been distinguished for a long time from F. venusta. It was first described by Jürke Grau in 1973. F. oleosa is considered part of the section Lignofelicia.

Distribution, habitat and ecology 
This species has been found growing in the company of the restionid Rhodocoma arida, Pelargonium ovale, Erica nervata, E. fimbrata, E. discolor, Leucadendron dregei, Protea eximia, P. montana, Cyclopia bolusii, Lobelia tomentosa, Helichrysum tinctum, Seriphium plumosum and Stoebe plumosum.

Conservation 
Felicia oleosa is considered to be a rare species because, although its population is stable and its habitat is inaccessible enough to not be threatened, it is only known from three locations.

References

External links 
 photos of Felicia oleosa on iNaturalist
 line drawing of Felicia oleosa
 distribution map of Felicia oleosa

oleosa
Endemic flora of South Africa
Plants described in 1973